Tripartite motif-containing protein 41 is a protein that in humans is encoded by the TRIM41 gene.

References

Further reading